The 1962 United States Senate election in Oklahoma took place on November 6, 1962. Incumbent Democratic Senator Mike Monroney was re-elected to a third term. After winning a sizable victory in the Democratic primary, Monroney faced Republican former U.S. Attorney B. Hayden Crawford in the general election. Monroney won his last term in the Senate before his defeat in 1968. This election marks the last time a Democrat won the class 3 senate seat from Oklahoma.

Democratic primary

Candidates
 Mike Monroney, incumbent U.S. Senator
 Wilson Wallace, former State Representative
 Billy E. Brown, Tulsa contractor
 Woodrow W. Bussey, Oklahoma City plumber

Results

Republican primary
B. Hayden Crawford, the former U.S. Attorney for the Northern District of Oklahoma and the Republican nominee for the U.S. Senate in 1960, was the only Republican candidate to file for the U.S. Senate race. Accordingly, he received the nomination unopposed and the race was removed from the primary ballot.

General election

Results

References

Oklahoma
1962
1962 Oklahoma elections